Llangarron is a small village and civil parish in southwest Herefordshire within  of both Ross-on-Wye (Herefordshire, England) and Monmouth (Monmouthshire, Wales). The population of the civil parish at the 2011 census was 1,053. The civil parish includes the settlements of Llangrove, Llancloudy, Biddlestone and Three Ashes. The church is dedicated to St. Deinst (a Celtic saint who died in c584). The village no longer has a post office nor pub, though it does have a community hall.

The name (also spelt Llangarren and Llangarran) refers to the Garron Brook, a tributary of the River Wye. Several local farms have Welsh names, a legacy of the fluid nature of the England-Wales border in the past. An alternative view is that the village is named after the Welsh word “garan” which means heron, stork or crane. This may explain the representation of such a bird in the church gates.

Church and other buildings

The dedication to 'St Deinst' exists for no other Anglican church. It is identified with St. Deiniol, or Deiniel, a sixth-century abbot-bishop who founded a monastery at Bangor and to whom the mediaeval Bangor Cathedral was dedicated. Records of a church at Llangarron extend as far back as Edward the Confessor, when a wooden ecclesiastical building was consecrated under the heirs of Ceheric ap Eleu, and was then re-consecrated under William I as "lan garan" church.

Other buildings of note in the parish, all of which are Grade II* listed, are Langstone Court, a late seventeenth-century red-brick house, Ruxton Court, an Elizabethan stone and half-timbered farmhouse, and Bernithan Court, which was built in about 1960 on the foundations of an older house.

Governance
An electoral ward  in the same name exists. This ward stretches towards Ross-on-Wye with a total population taken at the 2011 Census of 3,357.

See also
 Archenfield

References

External links

 Llangarron Parish Council
 Llangarron Community
 Llangrove CE Academy (formerly Llangrove CE Primary School)
 Llangarron Life Community Website

Villages in Herefordshire
Civil parishes in Herefordshire